The 1991 Saskatchewan general election was held on October 21, 1991, to elect members of the Legislative Assembly of Saskatchewan.

The Progressive Conservative government of Premier Grant Devine was defeated by the New Democratic Party, led by former provincial Attorney General Roy Romanow.  A major source of dissatisfaction with the Grant Devine government was the "Fair Share Saskatchewan" program, a scheme to distribute public service jobs more evenly across the province; a plan especially unpopular with workers scheduled to be relocated from Regina to rural districts.  The Devine government was also notorious for a home construction and renovation relief program which reimbursed homeowners who did their own renovations.  Another factor was the unpopularity of the federal Progressive Conservatives under then Prime Minister Brian Mulroney.

The NDP was able to win more than half of the popular vote, and an overwhelming majority in the legislature. The Tories lost almost three-quarters of the seats they had held in the legislature, and a significant share of the popular vote. Their loss in vote percentage resulted in 30 third-place finishes; this was more than their 26 second-place finishes or their ten seats won.

The Liberal Party – led by Lynda Haverstock – was able to attract a substantial share of disaffected Tory voters.  However, despite winning almost one-quarter of the vote, their support was too spread out across the province to translate into seats. Haverstock was the only Liberal returned to the legislature.

Results

|- bgcolor=CCCCCC
!rowspan=2 colspan=2 align=center|Party
!rowspan=2 align=center|Party leader
!rowspan=2|Candidates
!colspan=4 align=center|Seats
!colspan=3 align=center|Popular vote
|- bgcolor="CCCCCC"
|align="center"|1986
|align="center"|Dissol.
|align="center"|Elected
|align="center"|% Change
|align="center"|#
|align="center"|%
|align="center"|% Change

|align="center"|Roy Romanow
|align="right"| 66
|align="right"|25
|align="right"|26
|align="right"| 55
|align="right"|+112%
|align="right"|275,780
|align="right"|51.05%
|align="right"|+5.85%

|align="center"|Grant Devine
|align="right"| 66
|align="right"|38
|align="right"|38
|align="right"| 10
|align="right"|-73.7%
|align="right"|137,994
|align="right"|25.54%
|align="right"|-19.07%

|align="center"|Lynda Haverstock
|align="right"| 66
|align="right"|1
|align="right"|0
|align="right"| 1
|align="right"|–
|align="right"|125,814
|align="right"|23.29%
|align="right"|+13.30%

| colspan=2 align=left|Independent
|align="right"| 8
|align="right"|–
|align="right"|–
|align="right"| –
|align="right"|–
|align="right"|592
|align="right"|0.11%
|align="right"|+0.04%

|align=left|Independence (Western Canada Concept)
|align="center"|Hilton J. Spencer(default)
|align="right"| 1
|align="right"|–
|align="right"|–
|align="right"| –
|align="right"|–
|align="right"|46
|align="right"|0.01%
|align="right"|-0.07%
|-
|colspan=3| Total
|align="right"| 207
|align="right"|64
|align="right"|64
|align="right"| 66
|align="right"|+3.1%
|align="right"|540,226
|align="right"|100%
|align="right"| 
|-
| align="center" colspan=11|Source: Elections Saskatchewan
|-

Percentages

Ranking

Riding results 
Names in bold represent cabinet ministers and the Speaker. Party leaders are italicized. The symbol " ** " represents MLAs who are not running again.

Northwest Saskatchewan

|-
|bgcolor=whitesmoke|Athabasca
|| 
|Fred Thompson 3,253
|
|Frank Petit 331
|
|Darren McKee 184
|
|Mike Daley (Ind.) 114
|| 
|Fred Thompson
|-
|bgcolor=whitesmoke|Cut Knife-Lloydminster
|| 
|Violet Stanger 3,843
|
|Michael Hopfner 2,899
|
|Aldo Del Frari 1,333
|
|
|| 
|Michael Hopfner
|-
|bgcolor=whitesmoke|Meadow Lake
|| 
|Maynard Sonntag 3,719
|
|George McLeod 3,065
|
|Burton Dougan 467
|
|
|| 
|George McLeod
|-
|bgcolor=whitesmoke|Redberry
|| 
|Walter Jess 3,493
|
|John Gerich 3,206
|
|Ken Finlayson 1,185
|
|
|| 
|John Gerich
|-
|bgcolor=whitesmoke|Rosthern
|
|Kim Dmytryshyn 2,897
|| 
|William Neudorf 4,183
|
|Phil Biggs 1,825
|
|
|| 
|William Neudorf
|-
|bgcolor=whitesmoke|The Battlefords
|| 
|Doug Anguish 5,805
|
|Jim Hampson 1,683
|
|Donna Challis 2,417
|
|
|| 
|Doug Anguish
|-
|bgcolor=whitesmoke|Turtleford
|| 
|Lloyd Johnson 3,269
|
|Jerry Spenst 2,034
|
|Neil Currie 1,239
|
|
|| 
|Colin Maxwell**
|-

Northeast Saskatchewan

|-
|bgcolor=whitesmoke|Cumberland
|| 
|Keith Goulet 4,135
|
|Louis Bear 482
|
|Lennard Morin 505
|
|
|| 
|Keith Goulet
|-
|bgcolor=whitesmoke|Kelsey-Tisdale
|| 
|Andy Renaud 3,871
|
|Neal Hardy 2,783
|
|Walt Roberts 853
|
|
|| 
|Neal Hardy
|-
|bgcolor=whitesmoke|Kinistino
|| 
|Armand Roy 4,298
|
|Josef Saxinger 2,918
|
|Frank Orosz 1,326
|
|
|| 
|Josef Saxinger
|-
|bgcolor=whitesmoke|Melfort
|| 
|Carol Carson 3,011
|
|Ken Naber 2,516
|
|Rod Gantefoer 1,795
|
|
|| 
|Grant Hodgins
|-
|bgcolor=whitesmoke|Nipawin
|| 
|Tom Keeping 3,238
|
|Jim Taylor 2,784
|
|Richard Makowsky 1,134
|
|
|| 
|Lloyd Sauder**
|-
|bgcolor=whitesmoke|Prince Albert Carlton
|| 
|Myron Kowalsky 5,218
|
|Bert Provost 1,635
|
|Richard Stewart 1,888
|
|
|| 
|Myron KowalskyPrince Albert
|-
|bgcolor=whitesmoke|Prince Albert Northcote
|| 
|Eldon Lautermilch 5,405
|
|Terry Wiebe 990
|
|Hannah Shenouda 1,549
|
|
|| 
|Eldon LautermilchPrince Albert-Duck Lake
|-
|bgcolor=whitesmoke|Shellbrook-Torch River
|| 
|Jack Langford 4,098
|
|Lloyd Muller 2,358
|
|Walter Billay 1,177
|
|
|| 
|Lloyd Muller
|-

West Central Saskatchewan

|-
|bgcolor=whitesmoke|Arm River
|
|Bob Robertson 2,538
|| 
|Gerald Muirhead 3,019
|
|David Ashdown 2,301
|
|Hilton J. Spencer (Ind.-WCC) 46
|| 
|Gerald Muirhead
|-
|bgcolor=whitesmoke|Biggar
|| 
|Grant Whitmore 3,710
|
|Harry Baker 2,307
|
|Larry Toner 1,708
|
|Donald W. Kavanagh (Ind.) 65
|| 
|Harry Baker
|-
|bgcolor=whitesmoke|Humboldt
|| 
|Eric Upshall 4,422
|
|Dale Blair 49
|
|Arlene Julé 2,686
|
|
|| 
|Eric Upshall
|-
|bgcolor=whitesmoke|Kindersley
|
|Lorne Johnston 2,014
|| 
|Bill Boyd 2,766
|
|Judy Setrakov 2,244
|
|
|| 
|Bob Andrew**
|-
|bgcolor=whitesmoke|Rosetown-Elrose
|| 
|Berny Wiens 2,666
|
|Ansgar Tynning 2,581
|
|Linda Trytten 1,583
|
|
|| 
|Herb Swan**
|-
|bgcolor=whitesmoke|Wilkie
|
|Sharon Murrell 2,295
|| 
|John Britton 2,601
|
|Nick Volk 1,853
|
|
|| 
|John Britton
|-

East Central Saskatchewan

|-
|bgcolor=whitesmoke|Canora
|| 
|Darrel Cunningham 3,564
|
|Lorne Kopelchuk 2,746
|
|Roy Petrowicz 831
|
|
|| 
|Lorne Kopelchuk
|-
|bgcolor=whitesmoke|Kelvington-Wadena
|| 
|Kenneth Kluz 3,956
|
|Sherwin Petersen 2,594
|
|Bill Kerluke 730
|
|
|| 
|Sherwin Petersen
|-
|bgcolor=whitesmoke|Last Mountain-Touchwood
|| 
|Dale Flavel 4,028
|
|Arnold Tusa 2,523
|
|Ed Bespalko 1,691
|
|Paul Chesterton (Ind.) 47
|| 
|Arnold Tusa
|-
|bgcolor=whitesmoke|Melville
|| 
|Evan Carlson 3,656
|
|Grant Schmidt 3,048
|
|Ray Chastkavich 1,262
|
|
|| 
|Grant Schmidt
|-
|bgcolor=whitesmoke|Pelly
|| 
|Ron Harper 3,992
|
|Bernard Rink 2,055
|
|Louis Sliwa 652
|
|
|| 
|Rod Gardner**
|-
|bgcolor=whitesmoke|Quill Lakes
|| 
|Murray Koskie 3,621
|
|Glen Leggott 2,357
|
|Lou Coderre 1,297
|
|
|| 
|Murray Koskie
|-
|bgcolor=whitesmoke|Saltcoats
|| 
|Reg Knezacek 3,745
|
|Rod Roden 2,356
|
|Leslie Popp 1,033
|
|
|| 
|Walter Johnson**
|-
|bgcolor=whitesmoke|Yorkton
|| 
|Clay Serby 4,897
|
|Brian Fromm 1,846
|
|Donna Yaholnitsky 1,560
|
|
|| 
|Lorne McLaren**
|-

Southwest Saskatchewan

|-
|bgcolor=whitesmoke|Assiniboia-Gravelbourg
|| 
|Lewis Draper 2,647
|
|John Wolfe 2,583
|
|Tim Connors 2,148
|
|
|| 
|John Wolfe
|-
|bgcolor=whitesmoke|Maple Creek
|
|Bryan Oster 1,987
|| 
|Jack Goohsen 2,627
|
|Shirley Helmerson 1,865
|
|
|| 
|Jack Goohsen
|-
|bgcolor=whitesmoke|Moose Jaw Palliser
|| 
|Glenn Hagel 5,681
|
|Colleen Basarsky 1,920
|
|Michael Klein 2,120
|
|
|| 
|Glenn HagelMoose Jaw North
|-
|bgcolor=whitesmoke|Moose Jaw Wakamow
|| 
|Lorne Calvert 6,083
|
|Lisa Acton 1,164
|
|Randy Roman 1,799
|
|
|| 
|Lorne CalvertMoose Jaw South
|-
|bgcolor=whitesmoke|Morse
|
|Carl Siemens 2,101
|| 
|Harold Martens 2,682
|
|Ken Nelson 1,255
|
|
|| 
|Harold Martens
|-
|bgcolor=whitesmoke|Shaunavon
|| 
|Glen McPherson 2,350
|
|Ted Gleim 2,222
|
|Jerry Ruehs 1,733
|
|
|| 
|Ted Gleim
|-
|bgcolor=whitesmoke|Swift Current
|| 
|John Penner 4,399
|
|Lawrence Bergreen 2,731
|
|Archie Green 1,503
|
|
|| 
|Pat Smith**
|-
|bgcolor=whitesmoke|Thunder Creek
|
|Ron Bishoff 2,240
|| 
|Rick Swenson 2,929
|
|Bill Johnstone 1,639
|
|Dwayne S. McBride (Ind.) 66
|| 
|Rick Swenson
|-

Southeast Saskatchewan

|-
|bgcolor=whitesmoke|Bengough-Milestone
|| 
|Judy Bradley 2,419
|
|Darrell Rodine 2,297
|
|Laurie Unruh 1,665
|
|
|| 
|Bob Pickering**
|-
|bgcolor=whitesmoke|Estevan
|
|Leonard Haukeness 3,404
|| 
|Grant Devine 4,079
|
|Bob Jones 1,889
|
|
|| 
|Grant Devine
|-
|bgcolor=whitesmoke|Indian Head-Wolseley
|| 
|Lorne Scott 2,725
|
|Dwight Dunn 2,066
|
|Jack Hosler 2,069
|
|
|| 
|Doug Taylor**
|-
|bgcolor=whitesmoke|Moosomin
|
|Mary McGuire 2,954
|| 
|Don Toth 3,005
|
|Keith Lewis 1,475
|
|
|| 
|Don Toth
|-
|bgcolor=whitesmoke|Qu’Appelle-Lumsden
|| 
|Suzanne Murray 4,907
|
|Martin Kenney 2,426
|
|Dawn Garner 2,827
|
|
|| 
|John Lane**
|-
|bgcolor=whitesmoke|Souris-Cannington
|
|Ross Arthur 1,912
|| 
|Dan D'Autremont 2,980
|
|Don Lees 1,815
|
|
|| 
|Eric Berntson**
|-
|bgcolor=whitesmoke|Weyburn
|| 
|Ronald Wormsbecker 3,883
|
|Lorne Hepworth 2,725
|
|Bill Rudachyk 1,920
|
|Edwin Appenheimer (Ind.) 47
|| 
|Lorne Hepworth
|-

Saskatoon

|-
|bgcolor=whitesmoke|Saskatoon Broadway
|| 
|Pat Atkinson 5,027
|
|Lee Cutforth 1,445
|
|Jackie Stewart 2,891
|
|Greg Hill (Ind.) 107
|| 
|Herman RolfesSaskatoon South
|-
|bgcolor=whitesmoke|Saskatoon Eastview-Haultain
|| 
|Bob Pringle 4,630
|
|Bob Myers 1,698
|
|Dan Kolysher 2,485
|
|
|| 
|Bob PringleSaskatoon Eastview
|-
|bgcolor=whitesmoke|Saskatoon Fairview
|| 
|Bob Mitchell 5,955
|
|Gaby Akl 905
|
|Bill Mellof 2,084
|
|
|| 
|Bob Mitchell
|-
|bgcolor=whitesmoke|Saskatoon Greystone
|
|Peter Prebble 4,009
|
|Gary Hellard 1,094
|| 
|Lynda Haverstock 5,422
|
|Leslie Cushion (Ind.) 40
| colspan=2  style="background:whitesmoke; text-align:center;"|New District
|-
|bgcolor=whitesmoke|Saskatoon Idylwyld
|| 
|Eric Cline 5,986
|
|Carol Zanon 1,294
|
|Roland Loewer 2,562
|
|
|| 
|Anne Smart**Saskatoon Centre
|-
|bgcolor=whitesmoke|Saskatoon Nutana
|| 
|Herman Rolfes 5,452
|
|Jerry Ehalt 1,264
|
|Shirley Khan 3,048
|
|
|| 
|Pat Atkinson
|-
|bgcolor=whitesmoke|Saskatoon River Heights
|| 
|Carol Teichrob 4,908
|
|Ray Meiklejohn 3,578
|
|Ed Monuik 2,955
|
|
|| 
|Ray MeiklejohnSaskatoon Mayfair
|-
|bgcolor=whitesmoke|Saskatoon Riversdale
|| 
|Roy Romanow 5,254
|
|Gay Caswell 761
|
|Gary La Plante 1,398
|
|
|| 
|Roy Romanow
|-
|bgcolor=whitesmoke|Saskatoon Sutherland-University
|| 
|Mark Koenker 4,034
|
|Jim Laing 1,452
|
|Robin Bellamy 3,102
|
|
|| 
|Mark KoenkerSaskatoon Sutherland
|-
|bgcolor=whitesmoke|Saskatoon Westmount
|| 
|Janice MacKinnon 5,505
|
|George Turanich 1,008
|
|Myron Luczka 1,913
|
|
|| 
|John Brockelbank**
|-
|bgcolor=whitesmoke|Saskatoon Wildwood
|| 
|Pat Lorje 4,282
|
|Joan Black 2,509
|
|David Clark 3,123
|
|
| colspan=2  style="background:whitesmoke; text-align:center;"|New District
|-

Regina

|-
|bgcolor=whitesmoke|Regina Albert North
|| 
|Kim Trew 5,313
|
|Roy Gaebel 881
|
|Phil Biggs 2,520
|
|
|| 
|Kim TrewRegina North
|-
|bgcolor=whitesmoke|Regina Albert South
|| 
|Serge Kujawa 4,333
|
|Jack Klein 1,761
|
|Saul Jacobson 3,133
|
|John O'Donoghue (Ind.) 106
|| 
|Jack KleinRegina South
|-
|bgcolor=whitesmoke|Regina Churchill Downs
|| 
|Edward Shillington 6,049
|
|John Bergen 661
|
|Clyde Myhill 1,939
|
|
|| 
|Edwin TchorzewskiRegina North East
|-
|bgcolor=whitesmoke|Regina Dewdney
|| 
|Edwin Tchorzewski 6,695
|
|Warne Rhoades 990
|
|Bob Newman 1,969
|
|
| colspan=2  style="background:whitesmoke; text-align:center;"|New District
|-
|bgcolor=whitesmoke|Regina Elphinstone
|| 
|Dwain Lingenfelter 6,505
|
|Don Racette 854
|
|Cliff Chatterson 1,673
|
|
|| 
|Dwain Lingenfelter
|-
|bgcolor=whitesmoke|Regina Hillsdale
|| 
|Rose Marie Simard 4,851
|
|Shirley Schneider 1,677
|
|Larry Bird 2,930
|
|
|| 
|Rose Marie SimardRegina Lakeview
|-
|bgcolor=whitesmoke|Regina Lake Centre
|| 
|Joanne Crofford 6,286
|
|Bill Pratt 1,296
|
|Michael R. Giles 2,432
|
|
|| 
|Edward ShillingtonRegina Centre
|-
|bgcolor=whitesmoke|Regina North West
|| 
|John Solomon 5,660
|
|Jack Mock 990
|
|Liz Calvert 2,670
|
|
|| 
|John Solomon
|-
|bgcolor=whitesmoke|Regina Rosemont
|| 
|Robert Llewellyn Lyons 6,406
|
|Myrna Petersen 1,031
|
|John M. MacGowan 2,383
|
|
|| 
|Robert Lyons
|-
|bgcolor=whitesmoke|Regina Victoria
|| 
|Harry Van Mulligen 5,759
|
|Olga Stinson 1,000
|
|Louise Holloway 2,066
|
|
|| 
|Harry Van Mulligen
|-
|bgcolor=whitesmoke|Regina Wascana Plains
|| 
|Doreen Hamilton 4,532
|
|Gordon Martin 2,148
|
|Cam McCannell 3,086
|
|
|| 
|Gordon B. MartinRegina Wascana
|-

|-

| style="width: 130px" |Liberal
|Anita Bergman
|align="right"|2,566
|align="right"|57.05
|align="right"|+28.40

|NDP
|Kathie Maher-Wolbaum
|align="right"|1,794
|align="right"|39.88
|align="right"|-20.85

|Prog. Conservative
|Harvey Schmidt
|align="right"|138
|align="right"|3.07
|align="right"|-7.55
|- bgcolor="white"
!align="left" colspan=3|Total
!align="right"|4,498
!align="right"|100.00
!align="right"|

Opinion Polls
Maclean's (September 30, 1991)
NDP- 63%
Progressive Conservatives- 19%
Liberals- 15%

See also
List of political parties in Saskatchewan
List of Saskatchewan provincial electoral districts

References

Saskatchewan Archives Board - Election Results By Electoral Division
Elections Saskatchewan

Further reading
 

1991 elections in Canada
1991
1991 in Saskatchewan
October 1991 events in Canada